Kasautii Zindagii Kay (2001 TV series) was the Ekta Kapoor's second most awarded show after Kyunki Saas Bhi Kabhi Bahu Thi and the fifth longest ran show of Balaji Telefilms and one of the Longest ran serial of Indian Television. The show won both Technical and Personality awards in both categories i-e Jury and Popular. Urvashi Dholakia as Komolika Basu made a range winning most Indian Telly Awards for Best Actress in Negative role. Shweta Tiwari as Prerna Basu made a range winning most awards for Favourite Maa. Cezanne Khan & Ronit Roy also won numerous awards for their performances. The Cast of the show was also considered the GR8! Ensemblance Acting Cast in 2003. Kasauti was the 2nd Most Awarded and Entertaining Best Show of Star Plus and Indian Television, too. The show also won three International awards for International Favorite Serial in 2002, 2003, 2004.

Indian Television Academy Awards

The Indian Television Academy Awards, also known as the (ITA Awards) is an annual event organised by the Indian Television Academy. The awards are presented in various categories, including popular programming (music, news, entertainment, sports, travel, lifestyle and fashion), best television channel in various categories, technical awards, and Best Performance awards.

Indian Telly Awards

The 'Indian Telly Awards' are annual honours presented by the company of Indian Television to persons and organisations in the television industry of India. The Awards are given in several categories such as best programme or series in a specific genre, best television channel in a particular category, most popular actors and awards for technical roles such as writers and directors.

Asian Television Awards

Kasautii got the Asian Television Award from year 2000 - 2008 for most watching and awarded show rank at no. #2 in whole Asia.

Star International Awards

Kasautii also won International awards in 2002, 2003, 2004, and 2007. The show was not only honoured in India but also abroad, too.

Apsara Film & Television Producers Guild Awards

The Apsara Film & Television Producers Guild Awards are presented annually by members of the Apsara Producers Guild to honour Excellence in film and television.

Kalakar Awards

The Kalakar Awards are given by Bengali Federation of India to honour the Best in Regional as well as Hindi television and cinema.

Sansui Television Awards

Sansui awards awarded the awards to the following members of Kasauti in 2006.

Zee Gold Awards

The Zee Gold Awards (also known as the Gold Television or Boroplus Awards) are honours presented excellence in the television industry. The Awards are given in several categories.

Golden Glory Awards

International Iconic Awards

References 

Kasautii Zindagii Kay
Kasautii Zindagii Kay